The Yeshiva University High School of Los Angeles (abbreviated YULA, pronounced ) is a college-preparatory, Modern Orthodox Jewish high school founded in 1979 by Rabbi Marvin Hier. It has no affiliation with Yeshiva University in New York City.

The school is financially independent of and separately incorporated from the Simon Wiesenthal Center, despite their juxtaposition.

History
YULA was proposed by Rabbi Marvin Hier in 1977 along with a center to honor Simon Wiesenthal, shortly before he and his family arrived in Los Angeles. YULA was intended to be an affiliate of Yeshiva University offering secondary and tertiary education, but ultimately, it became solely a high school. As time passed, the Los Angeles Orthodox Jewish community perceived that Hier had placed more attention on developing the Wiesenthal Center, as opposed to the educational center. The school was ultimately founded in 1979.

Yeshiva University of Los Angeles purchased a $2.25-million facility for high school classes, located on Robertson Boulevard, in late May 1990. Rabbi Hier had outbid Sephardic Jewish and Sikh organizations for the site. Prior to the purchase, Hier had asked for $5 million in additional federal funding for the Wiesenthal Center. In response, there were serious considerations for establishing a new Orthodox Jewish high school in Los Angeles, and some parents at YULA had threatened to remove their children.

Campuses
YULA has separate campuses for boys and girls within the Pico-Robertson area of Los Angeles. The campus of the boys' school has 15 classrooms as well as a Beit Midrash and a Sephardic Beit Midrash which served as locations for davening and assemblies before the COVID-19 pandemic. The campus of the girls' school also has 15 classrooms, as well as two science labs.

Academics
The YULA curriculum is split into general (secular) studies  and Judaic studies components, providing both separate and cumulative GPAs for coursework completed. In 2018, YULA offered 13 Advanced Placement classes.

Composition
Each school has a student body of approximately two hundred students from different areas of Los Angeles. Many students live in the Pico-Robertson and Beverlywood neighborhoods, and in the San Fernando Valley. The Boys' School has 29 full-time equivalent faculty, while the Girls' School has 36 full-time equivalent faculty.

Student life

Sports
The school assigns teams to compete in basketball (varsity & junior varsity), baseball, fencing, swimming, tennis, volleyball, cross country, flag football, golf, and soccer.

In 1997, the school asked the California Interscholastic Federation (CIF) to move the November cross-country championships to a day other than Saturday; Orthodox Jews would not participate if the competition was held on a Saturday. The initial request was denied, but the school said they planned to file an appeal.

In 2009, the boys' basketball team forfeited two games against the Oakwood Gorillas in the CIF Liberty League, because the opposing team had drafted a 17-year-old girl– the all-boys team would violate religious practices by playing organized sports with a girl after their bar mitzvah. Rather than press the issue, as the other team was determined to uphold their Title IX right to maintain women members of the team, YULA chose to forfeit the two upcoming games against Oakwood. YULA asked the league to reconsider the forfeitures after an upset win placed them in contention for the playoffs, and shrink their season from 20 games to 18, but the request was denied.

Notable alumni
 Ben Shapiro, American political commentator, columnist, author, radio talk show host, and attorney
 Noam T. Wasserman, American dean, professor, and academic

See also

 History of the Jews in Los Angeles

References

External links 
YULA.org
Articles about "Yeshiva University High School" at Los Angeles Times

Jewish day schools in California
Jews and Judaism in Los Angeles
High schools in Los Angeles
Private high schools in California
Educational institutions established in 1979
Modern Orthodox Jewish day schools in the United States
1979 establishments in California